The Mehaffey House is a historic house at 2102 South Louisiana Street in Little Rock, Arkansas.  It is a two-story wood-frame structure, with a hip roof and weatherboard siding.  It has irregular massing characteristic of the late Victorian period, but has a classical Colonial Revival porch, with Tuscan columns supporting a dentillated and modillioned roof.  The main entrance features a revival arched transom.  The house was built about 1905 to a design by noted Arkansas architect Charles L. Thompson.

The house was listed on the National Register of Historic Places in 1982.

See also
National Register of Historic Places listings in Little Rock, Arkansas

References

Houses on the National Register of Historic Places in Arkansas
Colonial Revival architecture in Arkansas
Houses completed in 1905
Houses in Little Rock, Arkansas
National Register of Historic Places in Little Rock, Arkansas
Historic district contributing properties in Arkansas
1905 establishments in Arkansas